Tharparkar (Sindhi: ٿرپارڪر) (also known as White Sindhi, Cutchi and Thari) is a breed of cattle originating in Tharparkar District in Sindh province in present day Pakistan and also found in neighbouring nation of India. It is a dual purpose breed known for both its milking and draught potential. The cattle is of medium to large build and have white to gray skin.

Habitat
The Tharparkar breed has been named after the district in Sindh and Gujarat from which it originates. This district has large stretches of sand dunes, and adequate grazing is only available a few months after the monsoon rains (July to September). They are very well adapted to the extreme climatic conditions and feed scarcity of their home tract.

Physical Characteristics
Thari are medium-sized animals with a long tapering face, slightly convex forehead, medium-sized horns that curve upward and outward, and large, semi-pendulous ears. They are generally light-grey, with the colour deepening on the fore and hindquarters in males. A white stripe runs along the backbone. The tail twitch is black. They have a well-developed, firm hump, medium dewlap, deep barrel, and strong legs. The udder is medium-sized and strong. Cows are fairly good milk producers. Adult males and females weigh 400-500 and 300-380 kg, respectively.

See also
List of breeds of cattle
 Red Sindhi cattle
 Sahiwal cattle

References 

Cattle breeds originating in India
Cattle breeds
Thar Desert
Animal husbandry in Rajasthan
Cattle breeds originating in Pakistan